Senator Dutremble may refer to:

David Dutremble (fl. 2010s), Maine State Senate
Dennis L. Dutremble (born 1947), Maine State Senate